Acrosyntaxis accretans is a moth of the family Autostichidae. It was first described by László Anthony Gozmány in 2008. It is found in Afghanistan.

References

Moths described in 2008
Acrosyntaxis